The Bank for Agriculture and Agricultural Cooperatives (BAAC) was established in 1966. The bank is 99.79 percent owned by the Thai Ministry of Finance.

BAAC's Swift code is BAABTHBK.

BAAC's fiscal year runs from 1 April to 31 March.

History 
BAAC was established on 1 November 1966 as a government-owned bank to provide affordable credit to agricultural producers, either directly or through agricultural cooperatives and farmers' associations. BAAC assumed the functions of the Bank for Cooperatives (which had been established in 1947). In March 1993, BAAC was also authorized to lend to farmers for agriculturally-related activities, e.g., cottage industries, and more recently, for non-agricultural activities.

Performance
For the fiscal year 2014 ending 31 March 2015, BAAC reported total assets of 1,431,040 million baht and a net profit of 10,368 million baht. The bank had 1,327 branches, 1,074 service bureaus, 2,001 ATMs, and 18,372 employees.

References

External links
 BAAC Savings Mobilization, GTZ-CGAP Working Group on Savings Mobilisation, January 2010

Banks of Thailand
Companies based in Bangkok
State enterprises of Thailand
Banks established in 1966